The Judge Samuel Holten House (circa 1670) is a historic house located at 171 Holten Street, Danvers, Massachusetts. It is currently owned by the Daughters of the American Revolution, and open by appointment.

The colonial site first belonged to Richard Ingersoll (died 1644). In 1670 his wife left the land to her second husband upon her death, and thence to his daughter Sarah, whose second husband Joseph Holten deeded the lot (and perhaps also the house) to his son Benjamin Holten. Benjamin died in 1689, and his will records both the land and a house. Given this background, it is believed that Benjamin Holten built the house circa 1670 in a typical "one-room" layout. The house has been extended six times since until 1832.

The house is historically interesting as the home of Sarah Holten, who in 1692 gave testimony against Rebecca Nurse which led to her death in the Salem Witch Trials. During the American Revolutionary War, it was the home of Judge Samuel Holten, a Founding Father of the United States who served in the Continental Congress, including as its president pro tempore, was a signer of the Articles of Confederation, and who was an early member of the United States House of Representatives (March 4, 1793 – March 3, 1795).

The house was acquired by the Daughters of the American Revolution in 1921, and has been extensively restored.

See also 
 List of historic houses in Massachusetts

References 
 The Salem Evening News, Friday, February 25, 1921.

Houses completed in the 17th century
Holten House
Museums in Danvers, Massachusetts
Houses in Danvers, Massachusetts
1670 establishments in Massachusetts
Homes of United States Founding Fathers